Terry Chuong, better known as BIG is an American player who is currently a support for Optic Gaming of the North American League of Legends Championship Series (NA LCS). He has been previously known as both Baby and Babyeator.

Early life

Terry "BIG" Chuong was born in Rosemead, California. He started playing games when he was eight years old, and has played several titles, including StarCraft, Maplestory, and League of Legends. He started playing the latter  in the game's beta, enjoying the champion Heimerdinger in particular.

Career 
Chuong was introduced to the competitive League scene when a friend asked him to jungle for a team, which happened to be with Frank. He performed well and the team offered him a tryout, which he passed. He stayed with the team when the roster was acquired by Wazabi Gaming but then was replaced on July 6, 2014. In the eleventh week of the 2014 NA LCS summer split, he subbed for Counter Logic Gaming when the main roster was training in Korea.

2015 season

On September 3, 2014, Babyeator became one of the founding members of Storm, along with Lourlo, Hairyabs, mandatorycloud, and xPecake. The team was initially formed to attempt to qualify for the 2015 spring LCS via the Expansion Tournament. However, because their top laner Lourlo would not be 17 years old in time, they decided to wait until he would be eligible to compete to attempt to qualify. In December, they competed in the NACL New Year's Kick-off Tournament. They made it to round 4 of the tournament in the winner's bracket along with Enemy eSports but never played their final matches.

Storm participated in the NACS Spring Qualifier in January 2015. They defeated Zenith eSports in the first round but then lost to Team Dragon Knights and did not qualify for the spring season. In April, they competed in the AlphaDraft Challenger League, but Babyeator left the team partway through the tournament. He joined Frank Fang Gaming before the finals of the tournament, where they came in second place. In the NACS Summer Qualifier, Frank Fang Gaming lost to Cloud9 Tempest in the first round of their bracket and were eliminated. Three days after their defeat, the team disbanded.

Baby played for Team Dragon Knights for the first three games of the NA LCS Summer Season along with former FFG teammate LattmaN. He later joined Team Imagine after the second week of the NACS Summer Season. Imagine finished fourth in the regular season, with a 6–4 record. In the 2015 NACS Summer Playoffs, they lost in the semifinals to eventual tournament winner Renegades, but won the third place match against Cloud 9 Tempest to secure a spot in the 2016 LCS Promotion Tournament. Chosen by Team 8, they lost 3-1 - out of LCS qualification, but regardless retaining their 2016 NACS spring season placement.

2016 season
BIG was acquired by Echo Fox in that team's entry into the LCS. BIG left Echo Fox in November 2016.

References

American people of Vietnamese descent
Living people
Year of birth missing (living people)
Team Dragon Knights players
American esports players
Echo Fox players
Counter Logic Gaming players
League of Legends support players
Team Imagine players
People from Rosemead, California